Alizin may refer to:
 Aglepristone, a drug
 Alizin, Iran, a village in Zanjan Province, Iran